The HUGO Gene Nomenclature Committee (HGNC) is a committee of the Human Genome Organisation (HUGO) that sets the standards for human gene nomenclature. The HGNC approves a unique and meaningful name for every known human gene, based on a query of experts. In addition to the name, which is usually 1 to 10 words long, the HGNC also assigns a symbol (a short group of characters) to every gene. As with an SI symbol, a gene symbol is like an abbreviation but is more than that, being a second unique name that can stand on its own just as much as substitute for the longer name. It may not necessarily "stand for" the initials of the name, although many gene symbols do reflect that origin.

Purpose 
Especially gene abbreviations/symbols but also full gene names are often not specific for a single gene. A marked example is CAP which can refer to any of 6 different genes (BRD4 , CAP1 , HACD1 , LNPEP , SERPINB6 , and SORBS1 ).

The HGNC short gene names, or gene symbols, unlike previously used or published symbols, are specifically assigned to one gene only. This can result in less common abbreviations being selected but reduces confusion as to which gene is referred to.

Naming guidelines 
The HGNC published its latest human gene naming guidelines in 2020. These may be summarised as:
 gene symbols must be unique
 symbols should only contain Latin letters and Arabic numerals
 symbols should not contain punctuation or "G" for gene
 symbols do not contain any reference to the species they are encoded in, i.e. "H/h" for human

The HGNC states that "gene nomenclature should evolve with new technology rather than be restrictive, as sometimes occurs when historical and single gene nomenclature systems are applied." The HGNC has also issued guides to specific locus types such as endogenous retroviral loci, structural variants  and non-coding RNAs.

Naming procedure 
When assigning new gene nomenclature the HGNC make efforts to contact authors who have published on the human gene in question by email, and their responses to the proposed nomenclature are requested. HGNC also coordinates with the related Mouse and Rat Genomic Nomenclature Committees, other database curators, and experts for given specific gene families or sets of genes.

Revision 
The gene name revision procedure is similar to the naming procedure, but changing a standardised gene name after establishment of a consensus can create confusion and the merit of this is therefore controversial. For this reason the HGNC aims to change a gene name only if agreement for that change can be reached among a majority of researchers working on that gene.

See also 

 Human Genome Organisation (HUGO)
 Human Genome Project
 Human genome
 Gene
 Gene nomenclature

A complete list of all HGNC-approved gene symbols for protein-coding genes:
List of human protein-coding genes 1
List of human protein-coding genes 2
List of human protein-coding genes 3
List of human protein-coding genes 4

References

External links 

 HGNC homepage
 HUGO homepage

Biological nomenclature
Genetics databases
Genetics in the United Kingdom
Genetics organizations
Science and technology in Cambridgeshire
South Cambridgeshire District